Addie Township is a township in Griggs County, North Dakota, United States.

History
The first caravan of white settlers arrived in 1882.  Among these were the Gilbert P. Olson, John Paulson and Ole K. Olson families.

Demographics
Its population during the 2010 census was 64.

Location within Griggs County
Addie Township is located in Township 147 Range 60 west of the Fifth principal meridian.

References

KML File

Townships in Griggs County, North Dakota